This is a list of things named after Georg Cantor (1845–1918), a German mathematician.

Mathematics
Cantor algebra
Cantor cube
Cantor distribution
Cantor function
Cantor normal form
Cantor pairing function
Cantor set
Cantor space
Cantor tree surface
Cantor's back-and-forth method
Cantor's diagonal argument
Cantor's intersection theorem
Cantor's isomorphism theorem
Cantor's first set theory article
Cantor's leaky tent
Cantor's paradox
Cantor's theorem
Cantor–Bendixson rank
Cantor–Bendixson theorem
Cantor–Bernstein theorem
Cantor–Dedekind axiom
Heine–Cantor theorem
Cantor–Schröder–Bernstein theorem
Cantor–Schröder–Bernstein property
Smith–Volterra–Cantor set

Other
Cantor (asteroid)
Cantor (crater)
Cantor medal
Georg Cantor Gymnasium

Cantor